Alba Orbital is a Scottish company which builds PocketQube satellites. Alba Orbital is the developer and manufacturer of the Unicorn-1 and Unicorn-2 satellite platforms.

The company holds contracts with the European Space Agency.

Overview
Alba Orbital builds and designs picosatellites, which are small satellites under 1kg in mass. Picosatellites are modular, with each 1P of volume equal to 5cm x 5cm x 5cm and with the ability for modular units to be combined to get larger volumes. Its Unicorn-1 platform is a 1P picosatellite while its larger Unicorn-2 platform is a 2P satellite that is 5cm x 5cm x 10cm.

Launches
Alba Orbital is a launch broker, and has purchased capacity with several space companies, including SpaceX and Rocket Lab, in order to send PocketQube satellites into space. These launches harbor clusters containing space for PocketQubes that are sold to teams wanting to send a pod along. All Alba Orbital launches use Albapod deployers in order to release the clusters. These deployers come in two sizes: 6P and 96P. As of January 2023, Alba Orbital successfully launched four missions into Low Earth orbit, while one mission failed before deployment on the first flight of Orbiter SN1.

Funding
In 2021, Alba Orbital participated in the startup accelerator program Y Combinator, located in Silicon Valley in the United States. They raised US$3.4 million after completing the program.

See also
PocketQube – The satellite format Alba Orbital specialize in building

References

External links
Company website

Aerospace companies of the United Kingdom
Aerospace companies of Scotland
Space programme of the United Kingdom
Spacecraft manufacturers
Space technology
Manufacturing companies of Scotland
Technology companies established in 2012
Companies based in Glasgow